The MNL1 Data Center is a proposed hyperscale green data center campus to be built in Cainta, Rizal. If built, MNL1 will become the largest data center in the Philippines.

History
Singaporean firm SpaceDC announced in February 2022 that it plans to set up MNL1, a hyperscale data center, in the Philippines citing the country as the second country in Southeast Asia with the fastest data center growth and characterized it as a "dramatically underserved market". It acquired the service of property consulting firm JLL as MNL1's construction manager. SpaceDC assessed potential sites in Greater Manila for natural disaster risk such as earthquakes, flooding, and volcanic eruptions prior to settling with the Cainta site.

It is projected to be operational within 2022. If completed it will become the largest data center in the Philippines.

Facilities
It will be a green data center with a capacity of 72 MW and mainly powered wind and geothermal energy. It will host its own leading internet exchange as well as switch/ramp to cloud providers such as AWS, Alibaba, and Azure.

References

Data centers
Buildings and structures in Cainta
Proposed buildings and structures in the Philippines